The First Haines Ministry was the 1st ministry of the Government of Victoria. It was led by the Premier of Victoria, William Haines, with the swearing in of the ministry occurring on 28 November 1855.

*Was not elected to Parliament in 1856

References 

Victoria (Australia) ministries
Ministries of Queen Victoria